Pavlovici is a Romanian surname that may refer to
Cornel Pavlovici (1942–2013), Romanian football striker 
Dumitru Pavlovici (1912–1993), Romanian football goalkeeper
Florin Pavlovici (born 1936), Romanian writer and memoirist

See also
Pavlovići (Kakanj), a village in Bosnia and Herzegovina 

Romanian-language surnames